Millersburg is an unincorporated community, in Campbell Township, Warrick County, in the U.S. state of Indiana.

History
Millersburg was laid out in 1850, and so named for the fact two mills stood near the site, one of which was owned by Phillip Miller. Millersburg's post office opened under the name Canal. This post office was established in 1851, and remained in operation until 1903.

Geography

Notes

Unincorporated communities in Indiana
Unincorporated communities in Warrick County, Indiana